"Anyone Who Isn't Me Tonight" is a song written by Julie Didier and Casey Kelly, and recorded by American country music artists Kenny Rogers and Dottie West.  It was released in August 1978 as the second single from the album Every Time Two Fools Collide.  The song peaked at number 2 on the Billboard Hot Country Singles chart. The song also peaked at number 10 on the RPM Country Tracks chart that year.

Chart performance

Cover versions
In 2017, Adam Harvey and Beccy Cole covered the song on their album The Great Country Songbook Volume 2.

References

1978 singles
Dottie West songs
Kenny Rogers songs
Male–female vocal duets
Songs written by Casey Kelly (songwriter)
Song recordings produced by Larry Butler (producer)
United Artists Records singles
1978 songs